Hans Albert Hohnfeldt (22 May 1897, in Neufahrwasser, Danzig – 31 July 1948) was a member of the Nazi Party (NSDAP) who served as Gauleiter in  the  Free City of Danzig and acting Gauleiter of Gau East Prussia. He also held other Party and government posts in the Free City of Danzig.

Early life
After attending high school in Danzig and then in Neustadt in West Prussia, Hohnfeldt graduated in 1915 and became a war volunteer. He served during World War I in the West Prussian Foot Artillery Regiment 17, and was discharged in 1918 with the rank of Vizefeldwebel of the reserves, having earned the Iron Cross second class. Around 1919–1920, he served in the Freikorps with the Marinebrigade Ehrhardt. From 1919 - 1921 he studied law and economics at the University of Berlin. In November 1922 he entered the civil service of the Free City of Danzig as a tax administration officer.
In 1923 Hohnfeldt joined the Nazi Party but it was soon banned in the aftermath of the Beer Hall Putsch. He then became the first Danzig branch chairman of the antisemitic and Völkisch German Social Party, and in January 1924 became a member of the Danzig Volkstag (parliament).

Nazi Party career
After the ban on the Nazi Party was lifted, Hohnfeldt rejoined it on 8 October 1925 and founded the Ortsgruppe (Local Group) Danzig, becoming its first Ortsgruppenleiter. On 11 March 1926, he was appointed Gauleiter of the Free City of Danzig, the first holder of this position. Wilhelm von Wnuck served as his deputy. On 17 March 1927, after the resignation of Bruno Gustav Scherwitz as Gauleiter of East Prussia, Hohnfeldt was named Acting Gauleiter for that neighboring region as well. In September 1927 he became, in addition, SA-Gauführer East (commanding all SA units in East Prussia, West Prussia and Danzig). Simultaneously, he joined the SS with the rank of SS-Standartenführer and was named Gau SS-Führer for Danzig.

However, on 20 June 1928, Hohnfeldt abruptly resigned as Gauleiter and Gau SS leader in Danzig, and also as SA-Gauführer East, ostensibly due to illness. In reality, this was one of a number of changes Hitler made in the Gauleiter ranks, replacing those he felt were too socialistic in outlook, or whom he considered lacked the necessary attributes to be effective administrators. He was succeeded in an acting capacity by Walter Maass, the newly appointed Deputy Gauleiter. Hohnfeldt briefly continued in his role as Acting Gauleiter in East Prussia until 20 August 1928 when he was removed there as well. After a brief interregnum, he was succeeded by Erich Koch on 1 October.
  
In July 1931, Hohnfeldt became a specialist for civil service issues in the Danzig Gau organization, and in September he was promoted to head of the Civil Service Department there. In April 1933 he became the first Chairman of the Danzig Civil Servants’ League (Danziger Beamtenbund). Again elected to the Danzig Volkstag in May 1933, he would continue to serve there until it was dissolved in September 1939. He next became the leader of the NSDAP parliamentary group on 20 June 1933, and also was elected to the Senate of the Free City of Danzig. After the Reich League for Civil Servants (Reichsbund der Deutschen Beamten) was founded in October 1933, he became its regional head for Danzig. In July 1934 he was assigned to the central Party leadership (Reichsleitung) of the NSDAP in the Brown House in Munich. There, on 1 September 1934, he became the head of the Propaganda and Organization Department in the Main Office for Civil Servants (Hauptamt für Beamte). He also served as Director of the Danzig Civil Servants’ Association (Danziger Beamten-Verband) but in March 1936 he was given a leave of absence and discharged on 30 June 1936.

Leaving the Munich Reichsleitung post in 1937, Hohnfeldt returned to Danzig as Senator for Social Welfare in the city's administration. He served until 2 September 1939 when the Free City of Danzig ceased to exist and was incorporated into the German Reich. Further details of his life are unknown. He died in 1948.

References

Sources

1897 births
1948 deaths
Free City of Danzig politicians
Military personnel from Gdańsk
Gauleiters
German Social Party (Weimar Republic) politicians
Members of the Volkstag of the Free City of Danzig
Nazi Party officials
Nazi Party politicians
Recipients of the Iron Cross (1914), 2nd class
SS-Standartenführer
20th-century Freikorps personnel
German Army personnel of World War I